Walter Grant may refer to:

 Walter Grant (Scottish footballer), Scottish football midfielder
  (1875–1963), Italian actor
 Walter Grant (footballer, born 1884) (1884–1961), English football inside forward
 Walter Colquhoun Grant (1822–1861), British Army officer and settler in British Columbia.
 W. V. Grant (Walter Vinson Grant Jr., born 1945), televangelist